Multichannel audio may refer to:

Stereophonic sound, namely two channel audio
Surround sound, more than two channels, with loud speakers in the front, back and sides.
Ambisonics, or full-sphere surround sound audio.